Sepak takraw is not very well known in India, although it was a demonstration sport at the Delhi Asian Games in 1982. The Sepak Takraw Federation with its headquarters in Nagpur, Maharashtra, was founded on 10 September 1982. It is recognised by the Indian Olympic Association and Ministry of Youth Affairs and Sports since 2000. So far, the Federation has conducted 14 Senior, seven Junior, and six Sub-Junior National Championships in different cities and is also conducting Federation Cup Tournament and zonal National Championship.

The game is very popular in the northeastern state of Manipur and some of the best players hail from there. In the 22nd King's Cup International Sepak Takraw Tournament held at Bangkok, the India men's team lost in the semifinals and claimed bronze in the team event. In doubles event, the women's team lost in the semifinals, but won bronze medals.

India won the first medal in Sepak Takraw in Asian Games. India grabbed bronze at the men's team regu Sepak Takraw competition at the 2018 Asian Games held at Ranau Sports Hall, Palembang, Indonesia from 19 to 22 August 2018.

Total medals won by Sepak takraw Team in Major tournaments

References

Sport in India